Thomas Hedge (June 24, 1844 – November 28, 1920) was a four-term Republican U.S. Representative from Iowa's 1st congressional district, in southeastern Iowa.

Early life
Thomas Hedge was born on June 24, 1844, in Burlington, Iowa Territory, Hedge attended the common schools, including the North Hill school in Burlington, and Denmark (Iowa) Academy. He graduated from Phillips Academy in Andover, Massachusetts, in 1861, but his education was interrupted by the Civil War. In 1864 and 1865 he served as a private in Company E and as second lieutenant in Company G of the 106th New York Volunteer Infantry Regiment.

He graduated from Yale College in New Haven, Connecticut, in 1867, where he was a member of Skull and Bones, and Columbia College Law School in New York City in 1869. He was admitted to the bar in New York in 1869, and returned to Iowa to practice law in Burlington.

Career
For twenty years, Hedge practiced in a partnership with Iowa Republican politician J.W. Blythe, with the Chicago, Burlington and Quincy Railroad as one of the firm's clients.

In 1898, Hedge was elected as a Republican to the U.S. House seat for Iowa's 1st congressional district, then held by Republican Samuel M. Clark (who chose not to seek re-election). Hedge served in the Fifty-sixth and the three succeeding Congresses.  In 1906 he did not seek re-nomination. In all, he served in Congress from March 4, 1899, to March 3, 1907.

After leaving Congress, he resumed the practice of law.

Personal life
Hedge married Mary Frances Cook of Burlington in January 1873. They had three children: Thomas Jr., Lyman Cook and Anna Louise.

Hedge died at his home in Burlington on November 28, 1920. He was interred in Aspen Grove Cemetery.

References

External links

1844 births
1920 deaths
Yale College alumni
Columbia Law School alumni
Union Army officers
Republican Party members of the United States House of Representatives from Iowa